Miti is a village in Otepää Parish, Valga County in southeastern Estonia. Miti has a population of 17 (as of 1 January 2011).

References

Villages in Valga County
Kreis Dorpat